Sir Frederick Spencer Arnold-Baker (1 April 1885 – 9 December 1963) was a British lawyer.

He was the third son of Frederick Arnold-Baker (born 30 December 1845) and Helen Catherine Nairne (born 1 September 1843), and grandson of the New Zealand watercolourist Major Richard Baker (1810–1854). He was the Queen's Remembrancer from 1951 to 1957. His uncle, General Sir Charles Edward Nairne, was Commander-in-Chief, India in 1898. He was a founder and the second President of the Lansdowne Club (1940–1954).

He was knighted in 1954.

References 

1885 births
1963 deaths
Members of the Inner Temple
Knights Bachelor
20th-century English lawyers
Masters of the High Court (England and Wales)
Alumni of Oriel College, Oxford
Seaforth Highlanders officers